Strandvik is a former municipality in the old Hordaland county, Norway. It existed from 1903 until its dissolution in 1964. The  municipality encompassed the southern part of present-day Bjørnafjorden Municipality in Vestland county.  It included the inner part of the Bjørnafjorden.  The administrative centre of the municipality was the village of Strandvik where the Strandvik Church is located.

History
On 1 January 1903, the parish of Strandvik was separated from the municipality of Fusa to form a separate municipality of its own. Initially, Strandvik had a population of 1,876.  It was a small municipality and so in the early 1960s, the Schei Committee recommended that it be merged with two of its neighbors: Fusa and Hålandsdal.  So, on 1 January 1964, Strandvik was merged with Hålandsdal and most of Fusa, creating a new, larger municipality of Fusa. Prior to the merger, Strandvik had a population of 2,053.

Government

Municipal council
The municipal council  of Strandvik was made up of 15 representatives that were elected to four year terms.  The party breakdown of the final municipal council was as follows:

See also
List of former municipalities of Norway

References

Bjørnafjorden
Former municipalities of Norway
1903 establishments in Norway
1964 disestablishments in Norway